
Keshavarz may refer to:

People
Fatemeh Keshavarz (born 1952), Iranian academic, writer and literary figure
Maryam Keshavarz, American filmmaker
Mohammad Keshavarz (born 1982), Iranian futsal player
Mohammad-Ali Keshavarz (1930-2020), Iranian actor
Sousan Keshavarz, Iranian politician

Places
Keshavarz, Iran, a city in West Azerbaijan Province
Keshavarz-e Khotbeh Sara, a village in Gilan Province
Keshavarz District, in West Azerbaijan Province
Keshavarz Rural District, in West Azerbaijan Province

Sport
Keshavarz F.C., a defunct Iranian football club
Keshavarz Golestan F.C., an Iranian football club

Other uses
Keshavarzi Bank